Parliamentary elections were held in Serbia on 21 June 2020. Initially organized for 26 April 2020, they were postponed by a state of emergency due to the COVID-19 pandemic in the country.

In the period before the elections, inter-party European Parliament–mediated dialogue was held and certain changes in election legislation were made. Numerous parliamentary and non-parliamentary political parties boycotted the elections, including the major opposition coalition Alliance for Serbia, which said that there were no conditions for free and fair elections. This resulted in the lowest turnout since the establishment of a multi-party system in 1990.

The Serbian Progressive Party–led coalition won one of the largest parliamentary majorities in Europe. Election observer organizations declared that the elections were conducted efficiently according to minimum democratic standards, but noted some irregularities that affected turnout and results. The OSCE reported that many previous recommendations of the ODIHR were not adopted, at the same time criticizing the lack of freedom in the media.

Background 
Since Aleksandar Vučić came to power in 2012, Serbia has suffered from democratic backsliding into authoritarianism, followed by a decline in media freedom and civil liberties. In the 2016 parliamentary election, the ruling Serbian Progressive Party-led coalition and the Socialist Party of Serbia-led coalition returned to power, and the incumbent prime minister Vučić was successfully re-elected. However, in the 2017 presidential election, Vučić was elected president, and left the government for his new position. The election result sparked protests around Serbia. Thousands of demonstrators accused Vučić of leading the country towards authoritarianism. An OSCE report criticized unbalanced media coverage during the election campaign, use of public resources to support Vučić and reports of pressure on employees of state-affiliated institutions to support Vučić and secure, in a cascade fashion, support from family members and friends. Ana Brnabić was appointed head of government as a non-partisan politician, becoming Serbia's first female and first openly gay prime minister. Two years later, she joined the ruling Serbian Progressive Party.

In January 2019, Vučić stated that there was a possibility of holding early elections in 2019. Observers noted that this was highly possible, as it would enable the SNS to make electoral gains before having to compromise on unpopular decisions regarding the status of Kosovo, which was expected to hit the party's rating. In May 2019, the European Commission criticized election conditions and expressed a serious concern about press freedom in the Serbia 2019 Report. They also stated that there was a negative impact on the work of democratic institutions, in particular the National Assembly, and that there was an urgent need to create space for genuine cross-party debate and conditions for meaningful participation by the opposition in the parliament.

Anti-government protests 

Meanwhile, Vučić was also put under pressure by mass protests in Belgrade and other cities, with the opposition demanding more media freedom, as well as free and fair elections and ministerial resignations. The protests were precipitated by an assault on Borko Stefanović, one of the leaders of the newly formed opposition coalition Alliance for Serbia. These were the largest anti-government protests since Vučić came to power in 2012, with media reports estimating the attendance at protests to be between 25,000 and 70,000 people. Parallel to the protests, Vučić launched the "Future of Serbia" campaign, organizing rallies in all districts of Serbia.

After the largest opposition protest on 13 April, a non-partisan expert group was introduced that later formulated the demands of the protests, concluded there were no conditions for free and fair elections, and eventually drafted a comprehensive document with demands and recommendations. In early September, the protest organizers called for a boycott of the coming election because no recommendation of the expert team had been adopted.

Inter-party negotiations 
After the unsuccessful conclusion of the negotiations mediated by the University of Belgrade Faculty of Political Sciences and NGOs, the first round of inter-party European Parliament-mediated dialogue in Serbia took place in October, which was initiated by David McAllister, the chairman of the Foreign Affairs Committee of the EP. The Alliance for Serbia refused to participate, stating that there was no time for their demands for fair election conditions to be met before the election in April. In December 2019, following three rounds of dialogue, the EP delegation members announced that conditions for fair and free elections had not been established. After the last round, it was concluded that continued observation of implementation was necessary and it was agreed to move the election as late as possible.

The CeSID stated that changes in electoral legislation on three occasions during the election year were contrary to the Venice Commission's Code of Good Practice in Elections. The decision of the ruling party to lower the electoral threshold from 5% to 3% has been criticized by numerous observers, opposition parties, EP delegation members and Transparency Serbia, stating that it was not a topic of negotiation and that it will help some smaller parties enter parliament after the announced boycott of the largest opposition parties.

Participating parties 

After the 2017 presidential elections, Saša Janković, who finished second with 16.3% of the vote, formed the liberal Movement of Free Citizens (PSG) in May 2017. In October 2017, Vuk Jeremić, who finished fourth with 5.6% of the vote, formed his own liberal-conservative People's Party (NS), which cooperated closely with Janković's party.

In June 2018, opposition parties held talks on forming an alliance, which became possible with the election of leadership in the Democratic Party, which was in favor of allying with Dragan Đilas, who was very successful in the Belgrade local election, and the PSG and NS. This alliance of mostly pro-Western and pro-EU parties also included other opposition organizations, regardless of their stance on EU, including the right-wing Dveri, an anti-EU party. The opposition alliance was dubbed by the media and main participants in its formation as Alliance for Serbia (SZS).

Boycott 
Almost all opposition parties (except the Democratic Party of Serbia, Serbian Patriotic Alliance and Don't let Belgrade d(r)own) signed the Agreement with People in February 2019, where they promised to boycott the 2020 elections if they were deemed irregular. In addition, in September 2019, the protest organizers called for a boycott of the next election.

The elections were boycotted by several political parties, including the major opposition coalition the Alliance for Serbia (composed of the Democratic Party, Dveri, People's Party, Party of Freedom and Justice, Movement for Reversal, Fatherland and the United Trade Unions "Sloga"), the Civic Platform, as well some extra-parliamentary parties and movements, such as Social Democratic Union and the Do not let Belgrade d(r)own-led Civic Front alliance, which stated that the elections would not be held under fair conditions. Together for Serbia and the Social Democratic Party, also boycotted the parliamentary election, only participating in some elections at the local (municipal) level. Some individual politicians also declared a boycott, such as Đorđe Vukadinović, member of the National Assembly, and Ljubiša Preletačević, who finished third in the 2017 presidential election.

Electoral system 
The 250 members of the National Assembly are elected by closed-list proportional representation from a single nationwide constituency. Seats are allocated using the d'Hondt method with an electoral threshold of 3% of all votes cast (lowered from 5% at the previous elections) although the threshold is waived for ethnic minority parties.

While some parties choose to contest elections solely in their own name, multi-party coalitions are more common. This allows smaller parties to reach the electoral threshold together, while for larger parties it represents an opportunity to amass support from more diverse sections of the electorate.

Electoral lists
The following are the official electoral lists published by the Republic Electoral Commission (RIK).

 —

Opinion polls 
The highest percentage figure in each polling survey is displayed in bold, and the background shaded in the leading party's color. In the instance that there is a tie, then no figure is shaded. The lead column on the right shows the percentage-point difference between the two parties with the highest figures. When a specific poll does not show a data figure for a party, the party's cell corresponding to that poll is shown with a hyphen (-). If a poll was conducted prior to the establishment of a party, a hyphen is given instead of the result. Poll results use the date the fieldwork was done, as opposed to the date of publication. However, if such a date is unknown, the date of publication will be given instead.

The results of the SNS in different polls represent results of the party itself, although it usually runs in a broad coalition, which includes, besides SNS as the largest party, Social Democratic Party of Serbia, Party of United Pensioners of Serbia, New Serbia, Serbian Renewal Movement, Movement of Socialists, Strength of Serbia Movement, Independent Democratic Party of Serbia and Serbian People's Party. SPS formed a longstanding coalition with United Serbia, included in SPS poll results. All polls are conducted excluding Kosovo.

Polls conducted after official start of campaign

Polls conducted before official start of campaign 
 Italic text denotes parties and coalitions which declared boycott of the election.

Results 
The ruling Aleksandar Vučić — For Our Children alliance, led by the Serbian Progressive Party, won a supermajority of seats amid an opposition boycott.

Aftermath 

The election observer organization CRTA described that the elections "have met a minimum of the democratic standards, but they imperil democracy". They recorded twice as many irregularities and incidents than in the previous elections, stating that the irregularities could have influenced the results and that turnout would have been about 45% without them. The CeSID reported that the elections respected basic human rights, but the political competition was limited due to the opposition boycott and the unclear distinction of party activities from the public officials' activities. The period of the state of emergency due to the COVID-19 pandemic, which was called the "campaign before the campaign", was strongly criticized. They noted irregularities, including serious ones such as parallel voter lists, the pressure to vote at all levels of elections, the presence of unauthorized persons at polling stations, conflicts at and in front of polling stations.

The OSCE announced in preliminary findings and conclusions that elections were conducted efficiently, despite the challenges of the pandemic, but that the concern was caused by the dominance of the ruling party, including in the media. They noted that many previous recommendations of the ODIHR had not been adopted, including on election administration, media, campaign financing, and sanctions for electoral violations. However, some recommendations were adopted, but "key amendments were passed in a swift manner and without prior consultations, limiting the inclusiveness of the process". Furthermore, the OSCE noted the lack of diversity of political opinions in traditional media and attacks or pressure on critical journalists and media outlets as well as possible meshing of the ruling party's campaign and media coverage of the response to the COVID-19 crisis.

Political scientist Florian Bieber stated that the Serbian Progressive Party overtook the United Russia party to become "the largest ruling party majority in Europe after Belarus" and that the European Union cannot pretend that a "farce of an election" did not happen in Serbia. The president of the European People's Party, Donald Tusk, as well as Sebastian Kurz, the chancellor of Austria, and Viktor Orbán, the prime minister of Hungary, congratulated Vučić on his victory. Kati Piri, the vice-chair of the Progressive Alliance of Socialists and Democrats  (S&D) group, said that the election was not representative and that she is afraid "it won't change the erosion of the rule of law in the country", adding that "it should not be possible in a candidate country to the European Union". Tanja Fajon, the chair of the European Parliament Delegation for Relations with Serbia, stated that "the level of democracy has deteriorated significantly, let alone the situation of media freedom", citing that the absence of parliamentary opposition calls into question the legitimacy of parliament. In a joint statement, representatives of the S&D, Renew Europe and Greens–European Free Alliance, supported a request of the Serbian opposition to EU institutions to set up an expert group which would make a report "on the state and media capture", as the first step in resolving the political crisis.

The Assembly of Free Serbia, a project made by several professors, intellectuals and philosophers, has issued a press release saying that with the latest elections, "parliamentarism no longer exists in Serbia." The Assembly aims to form an opposition body which will elect its own members from the citizens and political parties with the aim of coordinating the opposition against Aleksandar Vučić.

In early May 2021, Vučić sent a proposal to Šapić about the merging of SPAS into SNS, which was accepted on the same day by Šapić. SPAS held inter-party talks during this period and its president Šapić announced that the party has been dissolved on 26 May.

Repeat elections 
The Republic Electoral Commission announced that ballots from 234 voting locations would be terminated and elections would be repeated at those locations on July 1. Due to the worsening of the COVID-19 pandemic in Serbia, CRTA announced that it would not be observing the repeat elections.

Notes

References

Serbia
Parliamentary
Parliamentary election
Elections postponed due to the COVID-19 pandemic
Parliamentary
2020 parliamentary election